The Meerbusch train crash occurred on 5 December 2017 when a passenger train ran into the rear of a freight train near Meerbusch, North Rhine-Westphalia, Germany. Fifty people were injured, nine seriously.

Accident
At about 19:30 CET (18:30 UTC), a passenger train operated by National Express Germany ran into the rear of a freight train operated by DB Cargo near  station, North Rhine-Westphalia, Germany. The driver of the passenger train was able to give a warning before the collision occurred. Fifty people were injured, nine seriously and three with moderate injuries. The train was carrying 155 passengers. The passenger train was travelling from Krefeld to Neuss. The freight train was travelling from Dillingen, Saarland to Rotterdam, South Holland, Netherlands. The rear three wagons of the freight train were derailed. The leading carriage of the Bombardier Talent 2 electric multiple unit which formed the passenger train was severely damaged. The rescue of passengers was hampered by fallen power cables, which were made safe by Deutsche Bahn. More than 200 firefighters assisted in the rescue efforts. The line between Düsseldorf and Krefeld was closed.

Investigation
The Eisenbahn-Unfalluntersuchungsstelle des Bundes (EUB) opened an investigation into the accident. It was reported that the passenger train may have incorrectly been given permission to pass a signal indicating “stop”.

References

2010s in North Rhine-Westphalia 
December 2017 events in Germany
Railway accidents in 2017
Railway accidents and incidents in Germany
Transport in North Rhine-Westphalia